Vítor Castro de Souza (born February 27, 1988 in Rio de Janeiro) is a Brazilian striker. He currently plays for Tuna Luso.

Castro made his professional debut at Botafogo in a 5-2 home win against Centro Sportivo Alagoano in the Brazilian Cup on January 1, 2007.

Honours
Rio de Janeiro Cup: 2007

Contract
1 March 2006 to 28 February 2009

External links

CBF

1988 births
Living people
Botafogo de Futebol e Regatas players
Associação Atlética Ponte Preta players
Tuna Luso Brasileira players
Association football forwards
Footballers from Rio de Janeiro (city)
Brazilian footballers